The International Socialists is a Trotskyist organisation in Sweden. It is part of the International Socialist Tendency and publishes a paper called Gnistan (Spark).  It was formed in 2002 by two members of the British Socialist Workers Party who moved to Sweden.

Early in 2010 they renamed their paper Antikapitalist.
Far-left politics in Sweden
International Socialist Tendency
Trotskyist organizations in Sweden